Artyom Sergeyevich Madilov (born 1 April 1985) is a former Russian professional football player.

Club career
He made his senior debut for FC Torpedo Moscow on 20 August 2003 in a Russian Premier League Cup game against FC Zenit Saint Petersburg.

He made his Russian Football National League debut for FC Anzhi Makhachkala on 2 September 2007 in a game against FC Zvezda Irkutsk. He also played in the FNL for Anzhi in 2008.

Personal life
His younger brother Ilya Madilov is also a professional footballer.

External links
 
 Career summary by sportbox.ru
 

1985 births
Footballers from Moscow
Living people
Russian footballers
Association football defenders
FC Torpedo Moscow players
FC Dynamo Barnaul players
FC Ural Yekaterinburg players
FC Anzhi Makhachkala players